Cracker Neck is an unincorporated community in Wise County, Virginia. It was also called Cracker's Neck.

References

Unincorporated communities in Wise County, Virginia
Unincorporated communities in Virginia